A Time to Die or Seven Graves for Rogan is a 1982 war-drama-criminal film directed by Matt Cimber and Joe Tornatore and starring Edward Albert, Rex Harrison, and Rod Taylor. It was shot in 1979. The producer had additional scenes written and shot without the involvement of the original writer and director.

Premise
A World War II vet sets out in 1948 to avenge the death of his wife at the hands of Nazis. His targets are four Germans, a Sicilian, and a Hungarian who committed the atrocities.

Cast
 Edward Albert  ...  Michael Rogan 
 Rex Harrison  ...  Van Osten  
 Rod Taylor  ...  Jack Bailey  
 Raf Vallone ...  Genco Bari
 Rijk de Gooyer ...  SS-officer

Production
A Time to Die was based on Six Graves to Munich by Mario Puzo.

The film marked the final feature film appearance of Sir Rex Harrison. After the filming Harrison retired from film and returned to the stage for remainder of his life.

References

External links
 

1982 films
American war films
Films scored by Ennio Morricone
Films scored by Robert O. Ragland
Films based on American novels
American crime drama films
1982 drama films
1980s English-language films
Films about Nazi fugitives
Films about Nazi hunters
Films set in West Germany
1980s American films